Rupal Patel is an Indian actress best known for portraying Kokila Modi in Saath Nibhaana Saathiya —one of the longest-running Indian TV soaps—and Meenakshi Rajvansh in Yeh Rishtey Hain Pyaar Ke. In 2020, she had reprised her role as Kokila Modi in the second season of Saath Nibhaana Saathiya for promoting the show.

Early life
Born in 1974 or 1975 in Bombay, Patel is a Gujarati and was trained in acting at the National School of Drama in New Delhi apart from having a degree in Commerce. She owns a theatre group, Panorama Art Theatres, which is involved in children's plays. She is married to actor Radha Krishna Dutt.

Acting career

Career struggles (1985–2009)

Patel first decided to test her fate in Bollywood, and debuted there via a minor role in the 1985 movie Mehak. She subsequently enacted unnoticed parts in other Bollywood films like Antarnaad (1991), Suraj Ka Satvan Ghoda (1992), Papeeha (1993), Mammo (1994) and Samar (1999). Few of these films were directed by Shyam Benegal.

After her stint in Bollywood, Patel ventured in 2001 into Hindi television industry playing the role of Lakhi in Zarina Mehta's Shagun on Star Plus. She was cast as Aashalata in Sau Dada Sasuna in 2002, and later featured in few episodes of famous crime thriller show Crime Patrol on Sony Entertainment Television. Her struggles in her acting career continued, and after a massive gap, she essayed Vrinda in Cinevistaas Limited production Jaane Kya Baat Hui on Colors TV in 2009.

Desirable success (2010–present)

From 2010 to 2017, Patel gained tremendous popularity and appreciation for her iconic performance in Rashmi Sharma's blockbuster soap Saath Nibhaana Saathiya on Star Plus as the strict Kokila Modi.

In January 2019, she signed a cameo appearance in Prateek Sharma's Manmohini on Zee TV as Usha/Kubarjra. From March 2019 to October 2020, she portrayed the grey character of Meenakshi Rajvansh Kapadia in Director's Kut Productions television show Yeh Rishtey Hain Pyaar Ke broadcast on Star Plus.

In October 2020, Patel reprised her character as Kokila Modi in the second season of Saath Nibhaana Saathiya entitled Saath Nibhaana Saathiya 2 which replaced Yeh Rishtey Hain Pyaar Ke. She was seen in 31 episodes of the show, as it was an introductory part. She appeared as a guest in Gangs of Filmistaan.

Other works

Patel is an ambassador for the Swachh Bharat India project and works for it; she received honour twice from Indian PM Narendra Modi for her works.

Filmography

Films
 Mehak (1985)
 Antarnaad (1991)
 Suraj Ka Satvan Ghoda (1992)
 Papeeha (1993)
 Mammo (1994)
 Samar (1999)
 Jaago (2004) – Cameo
 Pehchaan: The Face of Truth (2005)
 Sambar Salsa (2007) – Art Director

Television

References

External links 
 
 

Living people
Gujarati people
Actresses from Mumbai
20th-century Indian actresses
21st-century Indian actresses
Actresses in Hindi cinema
Actresses in Gujarati cinema
Indian film actresses
Indian television actresses
Indian stage actresses
Indian soap opera actresses
Actresses in Hindi television
Year of birth missing (living people)